Peace River is a L6 chondrite meteorite fall on the morning of March 31, 1963.

History
On March 31, 1963 at 4:35 a.m. A bright flash was visible at a distance of over 100 miles and strong booming detonations were heard.

As soon as enough data was obtained and the snow melted, the search for the fragments began.

Strewnfield

Classification
It was classified as shocked L6 chondrite.

See also
 Glossary of meteoritics

Notes

Meteorites found in Canada